Tasiilaq Heliport or Ammassalik Heliport  is a heliport in Tasiilaq, a town located on the Ammassalik Island in the Sermersooq municipality, in southeastern Greenland. Until 1997 the heliport was known as Ammassalik Heliport and is still listed by the Danish authorities under that name.

Airlines and destinations

Air Greenland operates government contract flights to villages in the Tasiilaq regions. These are mostly cargo flights that are not featured in the timetable, although they can be pre-booked. Departure times for these flights as specified during booking are by definition approximate, with the settlement service optimized on the fly depending on local demand for a given day.

Future
There are political discussions on building a new airport at Tasiilaq, the major settlement in the region, and to close the Kulusuk Airport.

References

Heliports in Greenland